2014 Rugby Europe Women's Sevens Grand Prix Series was the top level of international women's rugby sevens competitions organised by Rugby Europe during 2014. The series featured two tournaments, one hosted in Moscow and one hosted in Brive-la-Gaillarde. England won the Moscow tournament while France won the Brive tournament. Russia won the overall championship after finishing as runners-up in both tournaments.

Moscow

Pool stages

Group A

Russia 53-0 Sweden
Italy 0-29 Netherlands
Russia 22-0 Netherlands
Italy 29-12 Sweden
Netherlands 50-0 Sweden 
Russia 12-0 Italy

Group B

England 41-0 Belgium
Ireland 7-10 Portugal
England 24-7 Portugal
Ireland 22-15 Belgium
Portugal 7-12 Belgium
England 34-5 Ireland

Group C

France 52-0 Germany
Spain 26-5 Wales
France 29-7 Wales
Spain 40-7 Germany
Wales 21-14 Germany
France 10-5 Spain

Knockout stage

Bowl
Semi-finals (9th-12th)
Wales 38-0 Sweden
Belgium 10-5 Germany
11th/12th Match 
Sweden 0-57 Germany
Final:9th/10th Match 
Wales 14-0 Belgium

Plate
Semi-finals (5th-8th)
Ireland 7-12 Spain
Italy 0-45 France
7th/8th Match 
Ireland 31-0 Italy
Final: 5th/6th Match 
Spain 0-19 France

Cup
Quarter-finals (1st-8th)
England 29-0 Ireland
Russia 36-7 Italy
France 7-8 Portugal
Netherlands 19-0 Spain
 Semi-finals (1st-4th)
England 21-5 Netherlands
Russia 41-0 Portugal
3rd/4th place
Netherlands 10-7 Portugal
Cup Final: 1st/2nd place
England 24-20 Russia

Brive

Pool stages

Group A

England 33-7 Germany
France 29-0 Wales
England 33-7 Wales
France 19-0 Germany
Wales 0-21 Germany
England 7-17 France

Group B

Russia 34-0 Sweden
Spain 17-0 Italy
Russia 50-7 Italy
Spain 31-0 Sweden
Italy 38-0 Sweden
Russia 7-0 Spain

Group C

Netherlands 33-5 Belgium
Portugal 12-5 Ireland
Netherlands 33-5 Ireland
Portugal 14-7 Belgium
Ireland 5-12 Belgium
Netherlands 17-0 Portugal

Knockout stage

Bowl
Semi-finals (9th-12th)
Belgium 43-0 Sweden
Ireland 0-22 Wales
11th/12th Match 
Sweden 7-19 Ireland
Final: 9th/10th Match 
Wales 38-7 Belgium

Plate
Semi-finals (5th-8th)
Germany 0-40 England
Italy 7-14 Portugal
7th/8th Match 
Germany 5-21 Italy
Final: 5th/6th Match 
England 14-0 Portugal

Cup
Quarter-finals (1st-8th)
Russia 38-5 Germany
Netherlands 29-0 Italy
France 29-0 Portugal
England 14-19 Spain
Semi-finals (1st-4th)
Russia 31-7 Spain
Netherlands 0-26 France
3rd/4th place
Spain 10-19 Netherlands
Final: 1st/2nd place
Russia 12-24 France

Final standings

Tournaments

Overall Championship

References

  
2015
Sevens
2014 rugby sevens competitions
International women's rugby union competitions hosted by France
International women's rugby union competitions hosted by Russia
2014 in French women's sport
2014 in Russian women's sport
2014 in Russian rugby union
2013–14 in French rugby union